Intelsat 7, formerly PAS-7, was a communications satellite operated by Intelsat which spent most of its operational life serving the Europe, Africa, Middle East, Asia market from a longitude of 18° West.

Satellite description 
PAS-7 was constructed by Space Systems/Loral, based on the LS-1300 satellite bus. Designed for an operational life of 15 years, the spacecraft was equipped with 14 C-band at 50 watts and 30 Ku-band at 100 watts transponders.

Launch 
Arianespace launched PAS-7, using an Ariane 4 launch vehicle, flight number V98, in the Ariane 44LP H10-3 configuration. The launch took place from ELA-2 at the Centre Spatial Guyanais, at Kourou in French Guiana, on 16 September 1998, at 06:31 UTC.

Decommissioning 
PAS-7 experienced a sudden reduction of approximately 25% of its power capacity because a technical difficulty with one of the satellite's solar panels. The incident took place on 6 September 2001 when the satellite came out of solar eclipse. Services for all customers have not been affected. The satellite was retired in 2016 and was moved into a graveyard orbit.

References 

Communications satellites in geostationary orbit
Satellites using the SSL 1300 bus
Satellite television
Spacecraft launched in 1998
Intelsat